Coleophora brandbergella is a moth of the  family Coleophoridae. It is found in Namibia.

References

brandbergella
Moths described in 2004
Moths of Africa